Nigina Abduraimova (born 7 July 1994) is a professional tennis player from Uzbekistan.

Abduraimova has won 12 singles and 16 doubles titles on the ITF Women's Circuit. On 29 September 2014, she reached a career-high singles ranking of world No. 144. On 25 September 2017, she peaked at No. 175 in the doubles rankings.

Playing for Uzbekistan Fed Cup team, Abduraimova has a win–loss record of 25–29 (as of February 2023).

Career
In July 2016, she won the title at the $25k tournament in Qujing defeating Liu Fangzhou in the final.

In October 2022, she reached the final of the $25k Loughborough event, which she lost to Emily Appleton. A month later, she reached the final of the $25k Slovak Open in Bratislava but lost to Ana Konjuh.

In January 2023, she reached the final of the $40k Pune Championships, losing to Tatjana Maria.

Grand Slam singles performance timeline

ITF Circuit finals

Singles: 23 (12 titles, 11 runner–ups)

Doubles: 25 (16 titles, 9 runner–ups)

Notes

References

External links

 
 
 

1994 births
Living people
Uzbekistani female tennis players
Sportspeople from Tashkent
Tennis players at the 2010 Asian Games
Tennis players at the 2014 Asian Games
Tennis players at the 2018 Asian Games
Asian Games competitors for Uzbekistan
21st-century Uzbekistani women